High Proof Cosmic Milk is the seventh studio album by Polish thrash metal band Acid Drinkers. It was released on 18 March 1998 in Poland through Metal Mind Productions. The album was recorded in January 1998 at Deo Recordings Studio in Wisła. The cover art was created by Litza and Jacek Gulczyński and fotos by Andrzej Kurczak. High Proof Cosmic Milk is the last album recorded with Litza.

Track listing

Bonus tracks

Personnel 
 Tomasz "Titus" Pukacki – vocals, bass
 Robert "Litza" Friedrich – backing vocals, guitar
 Dariusz "Popcorn" Popowicz – guitar
 Maciej "Ślimak" Starosta – drums
 Lori Wallett – backing vocals
Music – Acid Drinkers
Mastering – Grzegorz Piwkowski
Engineered – Adam Toczko, Jacek Chraplak

Release history

References 

1998 albums
Acid Drinkers albums
Metal Mind Productions albums
Groove metal albums